Lockdown in Mauritius is a 2020, Mauritian Creole-language short film directed by Khem Ramphul and produced by FilmLab 360. Starring Ashis Ramphul, Khem Ramphul, Sneha Gookool, Reshmee Jeetun, Olivier Victoire and Akeelesh Hurnauth, the film was inspired by a short movie made by some Bollywood celebrities during the global COVID-19 pandemic.

Cast

 Ashis Ramphul
 Khem Ramphul
 Sneha Gookool
 Reshmee Jeetun
 Olivier Victoire
 Akeelesh Hurnauth

References

Mauritian short films
Films about the COVID-19 pandemic
2020 short films
2020 films
Films shot in Mauritius